Bas van Wegen (born 26 September 1984) is a Dutch footballer who plays for FC Emmen. His former clubs are NAC Breda and HFC Haarlem.

External links
  
 

1984 births
Living people
People from Nieuwegein
Dutch footballers
FC Emmen players
HFC Haarlem players
NAC Breda players
Association football goalkeepers
Footballers from Utrecht (province)